Daniel Clark (October 24, 1809 – January 2, 1891) was a United States senator from New Hampshire and a United States district judge of the United States District Court for the District of New Hampshire.

Education and career

Born on October 24, 1809, in Stratham, New Hampshire, Clark attended the common schools Hampton Academy (now New Hampton School) and Union College in Schenectady, New York. He graduated from Dartmouth College in 1834 and read law in 1836. He was admitted to the bar and entered private practice in Epping, New Hampshire from 1836 to 1839. He continued private practice in Manchester, New Hampshire from 1839 to 1842, 1844 to 1846, and from 1847 to 1861. He was a member of the New Hampshire House of Representatives from 1842 to 1843, in 1846, and from 1854 to 1855.

Congressional service

Clark was elected as a Republican to the United States Senate to fill the vacancy caused by the death of United States Senator James Bell. He was reelected in 1861, and served from June 27, 1857, to July 27, 1866, when he resigned to accept a federal judicial post. He served as President pro tempore of the United States Senate during the 38th United States Congress. He was Chairman of the United States Senate Committee on Claims for the 37th through the 39th United States Congress.

Federal judicial service

Clark was nominated by President Andrew Johnson on July 27, 1866, to a seat on the United States District Court for the District of New Hampshire vacated by Judge Matthew Harvey. He was confirmed by the United States Senate on July 27, 1866, and received his commission the same day. His service terminated on January 2, 1891, due to his death in Manchester. He was interred in Valley Cemetery in Manchester.

Other service

Clark was President of the New Hampshire constitutional convention in 1876.

References

Sources

 

1809 births
1891 deaths
People from Stratham, New Hampshire
New Hampshire Republicans
Union (American Civil War) political leaders
Dartmouth College alumni
People of New Hampshire in the American Civil War
Judges of the United States District Court for the District of New Hampshire
United States federal judges appointed by Andrew Johnson
19th-century American judges
Republican Party United States senators from New Hampshire
Presidents pro tempore of the United States Senate
Burials at Valley Cemetery